Anthurium microspadix is a species of plant in the genus Anthurium. One of the more widely distributed and variable species in its genus, it is easily confused with species such as Anthurium pallens and others.

References

microspadix
Plants described in 1858